Nob Hill Nature Park is a 6-acre oak woodland located in St. Helens, Oregon,  north of Portland, Oregon. Perched on a basalt bluff, it overlooks the Columbia River, at the point where Multnomah Channel joins the Columbia. Along with white oak trees (Quercus garryana), it also has a wide array of native wildflowers in spring, including camas, trillium, iris, and larkspur. A variety of invasive species are also present, including blackberry, English ivy, Lunaria (or money plant), vinca, mullein, thistle, and tansy

A community group, The Friends of Nob Hill Nature Park, holds volunteer work parties twice yearly, on the first Saturday in April and November. The group's goal is to return the park to a more natural state, similar to what might have been seen by Lewis and Clark when their expedition passed by in 1805.  Twice-yearly work parties remove invasive plants and add native ones.  They are co-sponsored by the community partner group, Scappoose Bay Watershed Council.

Free parking is available near the park's main trailhead, located at the city's wastewater treatment plant, at 451 Plymouth St, St. Helens, OR 97051. Photos from the park are available on the city's website. The park is open from dawn to dusk. Dogs must be leashed.

References

External links
City of St. Helens: Nob Hill Nature Park

Parks in Columbia County, Oregon
St. Helens, Oregon